Rendille (also known as Rendile, Randile) is an Afro-Asiatic language spoken by the Rendille people inhabiting northern Kenya. It is part of the family's Cushitic branch.

The Ariaal sub-group of the Rendille, who are of mixed Nilotic and Cushitic descent, speak the Nilo-Saharan Samburu language of the Samburu Nilotes near whom they live.

Phonology

Consonants

Vowels

Notes

References

 Antoinette Oomen.  1981.  "Gender and Plurality in Rendille," Afroasiatic Linguistics 8:35-75.
 Steve Pillinger & Letiwa Galboran.  1999.  A Rendille Dictionary, Including a Grammatical Outline and an English-Rendille Index.  Cushitic Language Studies Volume 14.  Cologne:  Rüdiger Köppe Verlag.
 Günther Schlee. 1978. Sprachliche Studien zum Rendille. Hamburger Philologische Studien 46. Hamburg: Helmut Buske Verlag. 
 Ronald J. Sim.  1981.  "Morphophonemics of the Verb in Rendille," Afroasiatic Linguistics 8:1-33.

Omo–Tana languages
Languages of Kenya